= Skinny Love (film) =

Icelandic film

Skinny Love (Icelandic: Einskonar Ást) is a 2024 Icelandic comedy-drama written and directed by Sigurdur Anton. It follows a 25-year-old adult content creator in Reykjavik, for one summer.

== Cast ==
- Kristrún Kolbrúnardóttir as Emilý
- Magdalena Tworek as Katinka
- Edda Lovísa Björgvinsdóttir as Kría
- Laurasif Nora as Marísa
- Berta Andrea Snædal as Júnía
- Kristjana Skúladóttir as Yrsa

== Production ==
The filming took place in Reykjavik, Iceland.

Kristrún Kolbrúnardóttir, who plays the lead role, had just graduated as an actor from Icelandic University of Arts a few months prior to accepting the part. Edda Lovísa Björgvinsdóttir, who plays the character Kría, was one of Icelands biggest OnlyFans models for a few years, including during production. Laurasif Nora had been one of Icelands rising TikTok influencers when she was cast.

The score was composed and performed by Brynhildur Karlsdóttir and Friðrik Margrétar-Guðmundsson, also known as electro-rock duo Kvikindi.

== Release ==
Skinny Love was released in Iceland on April 19, 2024.

It was released in Ukraine theaters June 19, 2025 under the name Онлі Лав (Only Love), and in Germany and Austria October 30, 2025.

The film had a limited theatrical release in the United States March 6, 2026.

== Reception ==
The Frameline Film Festival describes the film as a "funny, fitting look at the nature of Gen Z love and relationships, with a smart yet tender exploration of boundaries and consent" and praises its subtle humor and contemporary storytelling.

Andreas Köhnemann of Spielfilm gave the film 4 out of 5 stars, referencing "likeable actors" and "pointed dialogue", and concluding that the film is "A fresh look at the young generation, full of wit and empathy".

Another 4/5 star review came from Kino-Teatr, remarking "You can applaud actress Kristrun Kolbrunardottir in her ability to show her lyrical, pragmatic and romantic sides, and the balanced cast of the film in general."

Clarissa Lempp of Indiekino Magazine wrote "Director Sigurdur Anton looks into the world of a sex-positive generation that is self-empowering of its lust and the profit that can be made from it. Neither glorifying nor moralizing, he lets Emily make her own decisions, in a milieu that thrives on performance." Falk Straub of Film-Rezensionen also praised the film's sex positivity, writing "If you wanted to label a movie "sex-positive", it would be this one. The director's relaxed approach to sex in Skinny Love is inspiring. It starts with the protagonist and ends with her understanding environment. Rarely has one seen a main character who navigates the emotional turmoil of demanding sex work and several parallel relationships with such joyful, optimistic, energetic, and ultimately clear-headedness", adding "Whether during a post-coital conversation in bed or cuddled up in a shopping cart on a walk together, Sigurdur Anton often finds unusual images that simultaneously feel completely normal."

Saskia Balser of the lesbian magazine L.Mag wrote "Skinny Love manages to balance humor and seriousness and does so quite charmingly. It's simultaneously absurd and disarmingly honest. But the film doesn't stay on the ironic surface. The camerawork, the Icelandic setting, the everyday moments - everything lends the film a lightness of touch without becoming banal."
